The 1935 Notre Dame Fighting Irish football team represented the University of Notre Dame during the 1935 college football season.

Schedule

References

Notre Dame
Notre Dame Fighting Irish football seasons
Notre Dame Fighting Irish football